Imbricaria rufilirata is a species of sea snail, a marine gastropod mollusk in the family Mitridae, the miters or miter snails.

Description

Distribution
This species occurs in the Indian Ocean off the Mascarene Basin.

References

Mitridae
Gastropods described in 1850